Feng Baiju (1903–1973) was the chief leader of the Hainan Independent Column (Qiongya zongdui) of Chinese Communist fighters on the island of Hainan. Feng led the column in resistance to both the Nationalist Kuomintang, and the Japanese. The Japanese occupation of Hainan lasted from 1939 through 1945. The Communist takeover of Hainan did not occur until the spring of 1950 when mainland Communist forces joined with Feng's local column of fighters. Feng maintained control of political leadership on Hainan for a short time after the Communist takeover, but soon he was removed in favor of leaders who were more palatable to mainland Chinese leaders. He suffered greatly during the "anti-localism" campaigns of the 1950s, and again in struggle sessions during the Cultural Revolution, and died in 1973. Today he is celebrated as one of Hainan's local heroes.

Chinese people of World War II
People of the Chinese Civil War
Chinese Communist Party politicians from Hainan
1973 deaths
1903 births
People from Haikou
People's Republic of China politicians from Hainan
Victims of the Cultural Revolution
Vice-governors of Guangdong